Gulzar Singh Sandhu (born 27 February 1935) is a prominent Punjabi language writer. He won the prestigious Sahitya Akademi Award, given by the Sahitya Akademi, India's National Academy of Letters, for his short story collection, Amar Katha in 1982. Among other awards he was also the recipient of International Association of Authors, Playwrights and Artists of Canada in 1992 and Shiromoni Punjabi Sahityakar Puruskar from the Education Department of Punjab in 2001.

Early life and education
He was born on 27 February 1935 in the village of Kotla Badla in Samrala division of Ludhiana district. He has a master's degree and Gyani in Punjabi literature. He was married to Dr. Surjeet Kaur Pannu on 11 March 1966.

Career
He has held various senior posts with the Indian government, Punjab Agricultural University and Indian Red Cross. He taught in Punjabi University as a professor of Journalism and Mass communication. He was also the chief editor of prominent newspapers and the founding editor of The Punjabi Tribune published from Chandigarh. Due to his remarkable contribution to Punjabi literature has been honored with appointments to several educational and literary institutions such as Punjabi writer's academy, Punjabi literary academy and Punjab arts council.

He lives in Chandigarh, India with his wife and continues to make valuable contribution to Indian literature. His columns are published regularly in noted Punjabi magazines and newspapers in India and abroad.

References

Sources 
 Publication Bureau Punjabi University Patiala
 www.sahitya-akademi.gov.in

Punjabi-language writers
Journalists from Punjab, India
1935 births
Living people
People from Ludhiana district
Indian male journalists
Indian columnists
Indian newspaper editors
Academic staff of Punjab Agricultural University
Recipients of the Sahitya Akademi Award in Punjabi
Academic staff of Punjabi University
20th-century Indian journalists